Churton by Farndon is a former civil parish, now in the parish of Churton, in the borough of Cheshire West and Chester and ceremonial county of Cheshire in England. In 2001 it had a population of 146, increasing to 153 at the 2011 Census. The parish included the southern part of the village of Churton (the northern part was in the adjacent parish of Churton by Aldford).

History 
Churton by Farndon was formerly a township in the parish of Farndon, from 1866 Churton by Farndon was a civil parish in its own right until it was abolished and merged in 2015 to form Churton.

See also

Listed buildings in Churton by Farndon
Churton Hall

References

External links

Former civil parishes in Cheshire
Cheshire West and Chester